This is a list of newspapers in the United States Virgin Islands.

Daily and nondaily newspapers (currently published)
 St. Croix Avis – Christiansted, St. Croix
 St. John Tradewinds – St. John<noinclude>
 The Virgin Islands Daily News – Charlotte Amalie, St. Thomas
 The Herald – Christiansted, St. Croix

External links
 Online Newspapers from Virgin Islands at NewspaperIndex.com
 Online Newspapers: U.S. Virgin Islands Newspapers

United States Virgin Islands
Virgin Islands

United States Virgin Islands
Newspapers